An Euy Srey An is a highly popular 1972 film directed by Ly Bun Yim of Runteas Pich Pheap Yun. The film is a melodramatic love-triangle between Chea and Sou over a woman named Orn. The film stars Kong Som Oeurn as Chea, Virak Dara as Orn, and Nop Nam as Sou.

Plot
A poor farmer named Chea returns home to his family after going to school for several years and befriends a Sou who later inherits his father's wealth and high-ranking status.

Upon finishing school and returning home, Chea soon falls in love with his neighbour, Orn. His happiness is shattered when his ill father passes away and the landowner demands for their cow for an overdue rent. Chea pleas with the landowner to give him a few days while he goes to ask his old friend Sou for some financial help. Upon his arrival at Sou's residence, Chea quickly discovers that Sou's recently inherited status has caused him to ignore and pretend that he doesn't know Chea because of his peasant background. Chea is turned down and returns home with a predicament.

Chea and his younger brother soon begin selling noodles in order to make enough cash for the family. His luck is cut short when he realizes his competition against another noodle seller, making for many light, comedic incidents.

Once their debt is cleared Chea asks his mother to ask for Orn's hand in marriage. This is soon arranged and Chea and An become engaged. Both families then begin to raise money to have the wedding with Chea continuing to sell noodles and An selling silk cloths with her mother. One day An and her mother were stopped by Sou who instantly falls in love with An and decides to buy every piece of silk cloth they have. Sou also sends a henchmen with An and her mother to find out where they live just in case he may need to purchase more of their silk. The henchmen reports back that Chea is engaged to An and Sou arranges a plan to get rid of Chea, in order to have An for himself.

Sou promptly visits Chea and apparently apologizes for what happened earlier. He tells Chea that he will help fund their wedding. Chea's mother requests that they would need a honeycomb for the wedding so both Chea and Sou set out to find one. They eventually locate one high up in the tree and eventually fasten a rope so they can climb up. Chea goes first and when he reaches the top of the tree, Sou betrays him by having his men cut the rope preventing Chea from getting down. Sou leaves Chea to die and returns to An saying that Chea has fallen to his death and wishes Sou would marry An.

Chea remembers the lessons he learned from his mentor and tricks a bear into bringing him down the tree. He secretly enters Sou's and Orn's wedding ceremony under the disguise of a singer. Orn, still devastated from Chea's apparent death, decides to lock herself in a room and commit suicide. Her suicide is thwarted when Chea begins to sing and she recognizes his voice. She unlocks the door and embraces Chea. Sou disrupts their reunion by having Chea sent out to the forest to be executed and forces An to marry him.

Chea's younger brother quickly gathers a force of villagers who promptly save Chea from execution. Chea along with the villagers storm the wedding ceremony and Sou is killed in the ensuing chaos. Sou's father, realizing what has happened, restores order and justice. Chea and An are finally reunited at last.

Soundtrack

Cambodian drama films
Khmer-language films
1972 films